Hull is a village in Pike County, Illinois, United States. The population was 461 at the 2010 census, a decline from 474 in 2000.

Geography
Hull is located at  (39.707845, -91.205132).

Demographics

As of the census of 2000, there were 474 people, 192 households, and 130 families residing in the village. The racial makeup of the village was 99.16% White, 0.63% Native American, and 0.21% from two or more races.

There were 192 households, out of which 29.7% had children under the age of 18 living with them, 55.7% were married couples living together, 10.4% had a female householder with no husband present, and 31.8% were non-families. 28.6% of all households were made up of individuals, and 12.0% had someone living alone who was 65 years of age or older. The average household size was 2.47 and the average family size was 3.05.

In the village, the population was spread out, with 24.9% under the age of 18, 8.9% from 18 to 24, 28.1% from 25 to 44, 21.5% from 45 to 64, and 16.7% who were 65 years of age or older. The median age was 37 years. For every 100 females, there were 96.7 males. For every 100 females age 18 and over, there were 95.6 males.

The median income for a household in the village was $28,281, and the median income for a family was $34,464. Males had a median income of $27,375 versus $18,906 for females. The per capita income for the village was $13,821. About 15.6% of families and 16.4% of the population were below the poverty line, including 24.4% of those under age 18 and 13.3% of those age 65 or over.

References

Villages in Pike County, Illinois
Villages in Illinois